Love & Peace is a catchphrase of pacifism, and may refer to several music-related topics:

Albums
 Love & Peace (Edmond Leung EP), 2009
 Love & Peace (Elvin Jones-McCoy Tyner Quintet album), 1982
 Love & Peace (Emi Tawata album), 2008
 Love & Peace (Girls' Generation album), 2013
 Love & Peace, an album by Ray Charles
 Love & Peace (Seasick Steve album), 2020
 Love & Peace: Burning Spear Live!, an album by Burning Spear
 Love and Peace: A Tribute to Horace Silver, a 1995 album by Dee Dee Bridgewater

Films
 Love & Peace (film), a 2015 Japanese film directed by Sion Sono

Songs
 "Love & Peace", a song by Japanese band Tokio
 "Love & Peace", a 2006 song by Sifow from Clarity
 "Love & Peace! Hero ga Yattekita", the B-side to Morning Musume's single "The Manpower!!!"

See also
 Peace and love (disambiguation)

Love
Peace